"Tonight, the Night" is Bonnie Pink's twentieth single from the album Present. The single was released under the Warner Music Japan label on January 22, 2003.

Track listing
Tonight, the Night
Touch Me All Night Long

Charts

Oricon Sales Chart

References

2003 singles
2003 songs
Bonnie Pink songs
Warner Music Japan singles
Songs written by Bonnie Pink